Arras Football Association is a French association football team founded in 1901. It is based in Arras, France and plays in the Régional 1, the sixth tier in the French football league system. It plays at the Degouve-Brabant Stadium in Arras. From 1901–1997, the club was called RC Arras.  In 2013, the club made the ninth round of the Coupe de France and lost against Paris Saint-Germain 4–3.

References

External links
  

Football clubs in France
Association football clubs established in 1901
1901 establishments in France
Arras
Sport in Pas-de-Calais
Football clubs in Hauts-de-France